Shadows is an album by Luke Vibert under the alias Wagon Christ.  "Shadows" contains a sample from the James Bond film Diamonds Are Forever, titled "007 and Counting" on the original soundtrack recording.

Track listing
CD version
"Shadows" - 3:45
"The Groove (Souled Out)" - 1:55
"Loose Loggins" - 3:24
"Deux Ans De Maïa" - 2:46
Includes a QuickTime music video of "Shadows".
12" vinyl version
"Shadows"
"The Groove (Souled Out)"
"Loose Loggins"
"Deux Ans De Maïa"

Song usage
Miss Kittin used "Shadows" on her mix album A Bugged Out Mix.

References

2004 EPs
Luke Vibert EPs
Ninja Tune EPs